Orlando P. Carvalho is a former Executive Vice President of the Aeronautics division at Lockheed Martin Corporation.

Background
Carvalho grew up in Vineland, New Jersey and received a bachelor's degree in Mathematics from Fairfield University. He went on to receive his Master of Business Administration degree from the University of Maryland.

Work
He is a former Executive Vice President of the Aeronautics division at Lockheed Martin Corporation. He retired on October 1, 2018 and was replaced by Michele Evans. Before holding this position since 2013 Carvalho was vice president and general manager of the F-35 program. During this same time Carvalho was interviewed by ABC 4-Corners to respond to the scrutiny that the expensive F-35 program received. Before this, he was Vice President and Deputy of the F-35 Lightning II Joint Strike Fighter program; President of Lockheed Martin Mission Systems and Sensors. Carvalho also served on the Board of Directors for the Smithsonian National Air and Space Museum and on the Board of Advisors for the University of Maryland Robert H. Smith School of Business. In January 2020, Carvalho was elected as a member of the Board of Directors for Mercury Systems, Inc.

Honors and achievements
 National Management Association Executive of the Year for 2015
 Secured and managed the Spanish Navy's F-100 Combat System program

References

Year of birth missing (living people)
Living people
Fairfield University alumni
Lockheed Martin people
People from Fort Worth, Texas
University System of Maryland alumni
American business executives
Smithsonian Institution people